Bennie Dee Warner (born 30 April 1935) is a Liberian politician and clergyman. He served as the country's 25th vice president from 1977 to 1980.
Black Marks on White Paper, a documentary based on the life of Bennie D. Warner was produced in 2013. The documentary chronicles the life of Bishop Warner from his early years as a native Liberian, his education, his rise to leadership in the church and nation and his nomination and election to the vice-presidency of the Republic in 1977.  The film tells the story  of the military coup in 1980, which led to his decision to become a missionary to America for the last 35 years.
Bob Hager was the producer/Director of the documentary under auspices of Tiny Seed Films.

Born on 30 April 1935 in Careysburg District, Montserrado County, Warner was a bishop in the United Methodist Church for four years before he was plucked from relative obscurity to become Vice President in 1977, succeeding James Edward Greene. Warner was attending a conference of Methodist bishops in Nashville, Indiana when a military coup led by Samuel Doe overthrew the Liberian government on 12 April 1980. Warner attempted to form a government in exile in Ivory Coast to challenge the coup makers.  A month after he was evicted from political power, he was removed from ecclesiastical power: Methodist minister D. Sieh Doe proclaimed the bishopric vacant, and for six months the seat was empty and the church run by Warner's administrative assistant.  On 6 December, the Liberia Annual Conference elected as his successor Bishop Arthur Flumo Kulah formerly the dean of the Gbarnga School of Theology.  Warner had been the second native Liberian bishop in the history of the church in Liberia.  Four years after Tolbert was overthrown, Commander-in-Chief Samuel Doe proclaimed clemency for him and announced that Warner was free to return to Liberia.

Bishop Warner later established residence in Oklahoma City, where he taught at the United Methodist Oklahoma City University and pastored Quayle United Methodist Church. He then served in Syracuse N.Y, before being appointed District Superintendent of the Camden District of the United Methodist Church in Arkansas.

References

Vice presidents of Liberia
Living people
1935 births
Oklahoma City University faculty
Liberian bishops
People from Montserrado County
Liberian United Methodist bishops
American United Methodists
Liberian emigrants to the United States
20th-century Liberian politicians